Robert Schiel (born 26 October 1939) is a Luxembourgian épée and foil fencer. He competed at the 1960, 1972 and 1976 Summer Olympics.

References

External links
 

1939 births
Living people
Luxembourgian male foil fencers
Luxembourgian male épée fencers
Olympic fencers of Luxembourg
Fencers at the 1960 Summer Olympics
Fencers at the 1972 Summer Olympics
Fencers at the 1976 Summer Olympics
People from Dudelange